The Pa-aat River, formerly known as the Salmon River and also as the Paaat River, is a small river on Pitt Island in the North Coast region of British Columbia, Canada.  It flows north to enter Grenville Channel opposite Baker Inlet via Salmon Inlet, at the mouth of which is Pa-aat Indian Reserve No. 6, which is governed by the Gitxaala Nation of the Tsimshian.

See also
Salmon River (disambiguation)
List of British Columbia rivers

References

Rivers of the North Coast of British Columbia